Ceratodacus is a genus of tephritid fruitfly. The type species C. longicornis is found in South America in Brazil, Guyana and Peru. Nothing is known about its host plant. A second species, C. priscus  has been described from Dominican amber (Upper Eocene, age estimates vary widely from 15 to 45 million years).

References 

Tephritidae genera